Maria Whittaker (born 7 October 1969), also known as Maria Tafari, is an English former glamour model, Page 3 girl, and pop singer.

Modelling career
Born on 7 October 1969 in Hounslow, Middlesex, Whittaker made her Page 3 debut in The Sun in 1985, aged 16. With her brunette hair, good looks and natural 36DD breasts, she became one of the most celebrated glamour models of the 1980s. She was named The Sun's Page 3 Girl of the Year in 1989. Whittaker also appeared nude in Mayfair and other men's magazines.

In the late 1980s, she appeared with Michael Van Wijk (later known as Wolf from the television show Gladiators) on the cover of Palace Software's computer games Barbarian: The Ultimate Warrior (1987) and Barbarian II: The Dungeon of Drax (1988).

Whittaker is ranked as Glamour Girl No. 80 in Glamour Girls: An Illustrated Encyclopedia.

Music and television
Whittaker appeared as a Hill's Angel in two episodes of The Benny Hill Show in 1983. In 1986, she had a cameo role in the movie version of Whoops Apocalypse. She made her second screen appearance in the thriller film Tank Malling in 1989.

The music video for the 1986 Genesis song "Anything She Does" featured Benny Hill looking at Whittaker topless on Page 3.

Whittaker formed the band Rhythm Zone in 1990, with her as lead vocalist. The band was short-lived, releasing one unsuccessful single named "Stop Right Now (Take My Number)".

Personal life
Her younger sister Lisa Whittaker (born September 1970 in Hounslow) also appeared as a Page 3 girl and the sisters posed together for topless photo shoots. She has an older brother, David, who is an accountant in London.

Whittaker is married to Michael West, better known as record producer Rebel MC and Congo Natty. She has three children. Trinity Tafari, her youngest child, is a world champion at street dance, and is a part of dance group IMD, which has been featured on Got to Dance and Britain's Got Talent.

References

External links
 
 
 Forgotten Beauties – Maria Whittaker Interestment.co.uk

1969 births
20th-century English singers
20th-century English women singers
Living people
English women pop singers
English female models
English female adult models
Glamour models
Page 3 girls
People from Hounslow